Yankee Pasha is a historical novel written by Edison Marshall and published in 1947, the full title is Yankee Pasha-The Adventures of Jason Starbuck.

It is suggested that Yankee Pasha is probably Marshall's best-known work and one of the most popular. Yankee Pasha was indeed very popular and has seen seven different editions with many separate printings between 1947 and 1975 in the U.S.A. and Europe. Upon initial publication, the book received positive reviews including that of Fletcher Pratt, the American writer particularly noted for his works on naval history, that appeared in the December 6, 1947 issue of the Saturday Review.

As in most of the novels of Edison Marshall, readers informed about local history and names can see references to his past life in Oregon in Yankee Pasha.

One of the paperback covers of the book was realized by the American realist artist James Bama and another one was made by famous paperback book cover artist Robert Stanley.

The book is made into a film in 1954, Yankee Pasha, starring Jeff Chandler and Rhonda Fleming, and featuring Mamie Van Doren. It was released by Universal Pictures.

References 

1947 American novels
American historical novels
American novels adapted into films